Westminster Council may be:

Westminster City Council
Westminster Council (Maryland)